"Can't Keep a Good Man Down" is a song written by Bob Corbin, and recorded by American country music band Alabama.  It was released in August 1985 as the third and final single from the band's album 40-Hour Week.

That November, it became the band's 18th straight No. 1 song in as many single releases, extending their streak just set three months earlier with "40 Hour Week (For a Livin')".

Music video
A music video was filmed for the song, and has aired on CMT and Great American Country.

Chart positions

References

Sources
 Roland, Tom, "The Billboard Book of Number One Country Hits" (Billboard Books, Watson-Guptill Publications, New York, 1991)

1985 singles
1985 songs
Alabama (American band) songs
Song recordings produced by Harold Shedd
RCA Records singles
Songs written by Bob Corbin (songwriter)